The Army cricket team is a cricket side representing the British Army. 

The Army team played 51 first-class matches between 1912 and 1939, although a combined Army and Navy side had played two games against a combined Oxford and Cambridge team in 1910 and 1911. In 1927 the Army played the touring New Zealanders, and in 1933 they played the touring West Indians.

After the Second World War, for first-class purposes the Army team amalgamated with the Navy and Air Force teams to form the Combined Services team, which played first-class cricket until 1964. 

The Army team continues to play cricket at non-first-class level. The sides are managed by the Army Cricket Association which also runs under-25 and women's teams. The Army also have another team in Germany, known as BA(G). The main team occasionally organises friendlies with allies, particularly against their army counterparts from cricket-playing nations such as Afghanistan and South Africa, and charities matches against local clubs.

Their home ground is the Officers Club Services Ground, Aldershot, Hampshire.

See also
 Royal Navy cricket team
 Royal Air Force cricket team
 Combined Services cricket team

References

External links
Army Cricket Association

 
English club cricket teams
Former senior cricket clubs
Military cricket teams